Boleros rancheros con la acariciante voz de Flor Silvestre is a studio album by Mexican singer Flor Silvestre, released in 1967 by Musart Records.

Critical reception
Music critic Tomás Fundora, in his Record World column, commended the album: "Flor Silvestre's [most recent] recording for Musart is very good, containing 'El Despertar', 'Hambre', 'Aunque me Hagas Llorar', 'Pídele a Dios', and '¿Quién es?', among others".

Track listing
Side one
 "El despertar"
 "Miel amarga"
 "La enramada"
 "Hambre"
 "Me tienes en el olvido"
 "Aunque me hagas llorar"

Side two
 "Corazón salvaje"
 "Noche callada"
 "Amor y traición
 "Una imploración"
 "Pídele a Dios"
 "¿Quién es?"

Personnel
 Mariachi México – accompaniment

References

External links
 Boleros rancheros con la acariciante voz de Flor Silvestre at AllMusic

1967 albums
Flor Silvestre albums
Musart Records albums
Spanish-language albums